The Breda Ba.15 was a two-seat light aircraft produced in Italy in 1928.

Design and development
The Ba.15 was a high-wing braced monoplane of conventional design that seated the pilot and passenger in tandem within a fully enclosed cabin. Ba.15s were fitted with a wide variety of engines. The most popularly selected was the Walter Venus, but examples also left the factory powered by Cirrus III, de Havilland Gipsy, Colombo S.63, Walter Mars I, and Isotta Fraschini 80 T engines.

Operational history
Breda Ba.15s took part in several competitions. Among others, in August 1930 Col. Sacchi won the race Giro Aereo d'Italia flying Breda Ba.15S (altogether 10 Bredas took part in this contest).
Besides their civil use, some Ba.15s were operated by the Regia Aeronautica. An example is preserved at the Museo Nazionale della Scienza e della Tecnologia in Milan.
One Ba.15 was bought in 1929 by an Italian resident in Paraguay, Nicola Bo. The plane had the Italian civil registration I-AAUG. This plane was later sold to the Paraguayan Military Aviation and used in the Chaco War as a light transport plane with the serial T-8. It was destroyed in an accident in 1933.

Variants

 Ba.15 : Two-seat cabin touring, sporting aircraft.
 Ba.15S : Improved version.

Operators

Ethiopian Air Force

Regia Aeronautica

Paraguayan Air Arm

Specifications (Ba.15S)

|related=
|similar aircraft=
|lists=
|see also=
}}-->

References

 
 aerei-italiani.net
 "La Contribución Italiana en la Aviación Paraguaya". Antonio Luis Sapienza Fracchia. Author's edition. Asunción, 2007. 300pp.

Ba.015
1920s Italian civil utility aircraft
High-wing aircraft
Single-engined tractor aircraft
Aircraft first flown in 1928